The 2021 ICF World Junior and U23 Canoe Slalom Championships took place in Ljubljana, Slovenia, from 6 to 11 July 2021, under the auspices of the International Canoe Federation (ICF). It was the 22nd edition of the competition for Juniors (U18) and the 9th edition for the Under 23 category.

Medal summary

Men

Canoe

Junior

U23

Kayak

Junior

U23

Women

Canoe

Junior

U23

Kayak

Junior

U23

Mixed

Canoe

Junior
Only three boats from two countries entered the mixed C2 junior event, which meant that no medals were awarded. A minimum of 6 countries is required for an event to count as a  world championship.

Medal table

References

External links
International Canoe Federation

ICF World Junior and U23 Canoe Slalom Championships
World Junior and U23 Canoe Slalom Championships
World Junior and U23 Canoe Slalom Championships
World Junior and U23 Canoe Slalom Championships